This page lists events from the year 1268 in Ireland.

Incumbent
Lord: Henry III

Events
The Irish Franciscan friars establish a monastery in Multyfarnham.

Births

Deaths
Conchobar Ó Cellaigh, 43rd King of Uí Maine and 10th Chief of the Name.

References